Creative Health Care Management (CHCM) is a private U.S. corporation, which provides consultation and training in the health care sector. CHCM is based in Bloomington, Minnesota. Founded in 1982 by Marie Manthey, it was originally called Creative Nursing Management. The name change to CHCM was in recognition of the systemic nature of change.

Consulting Practice 
Creative Nursing Management (later named Creative Health Care Management) was originally established to support the implementation of primary nursing, by applying lessons learned from the original implementation at the University Hospital.

Creative Nursing Management developed a curriculum to prepare staff nurses to become nursing managers. It is licensed to organizations around the world, who do their own 'train-the-trainer' trainings and then are able to provide the content themselves.

Creative Nursing Management became Creative Health Care Management in recognition of a shift to a partnership model in the way the company defined its relationship with health care providers.

Nursing literature 
The Practice of Primary Nursing was first published in 1980 by Blackwell Scientific. The updated 2002 edition that Creative Health Care Management published was well received.

The book Relationship-Based Care: A Model for Transforming Practice was published by CHCM in 2004, and it applies the original concepts of Primary Nursing to all functions and relationships within the hospital setting. The RBC book has been translated into German and other languages 

In 2007 CHCM published 'I2E2: Leading Lasting Change,' by Jayne Felgen.

CHCM published 'See Me As a Person: Creating Therapeutic Relationships with Patients and Their Families' by Mary Koloroutis, RN and Michael Trout in 2012.

In 2016 CHCM published 'Primary Nursing: Person-Centered Care Delivery System Design' by Susan Wessel and Marie Manthey.

CHCM published 'Advancing Relationship-Based Culture' by Mary Koloroutis, RN and David Abelson, MD in 2017. Advancing Relationship-Based Cultures explores the confluence of relational and clinical competence that advances relationship-based healing cultures. Advancing Relationship-Based Cultures won the 2018 American College of Healthcare Executives James A. Hamiliton Book of the Year Award.

Titles published (selected) 
 Madden, Mary Jane and Marie Manthey, Manual for Nurse Managers (1987)
 Lampe, Susan,  Focus Charting: A Patient-Centered Approach (1992)
 Manthey, Marie, The practice of primary nursing : relationship-based resource-driven care delivery (2002)
 Koloroutis, Mary, Jayne Felgen, Donna Wright, Colleen Person, Marie Manthey and Leah Kinnaird, Relationship-Based Care: A Model for Transforming Practice (2004)
 Koloroutis, Mary, Jayne Felgen, Colleen Person and Susan Wessel, Relationship-Based Care Field Guide (2007)
 Felgen, Jayne, I2E2: Leading Lasting Change (2007)
 Koloroutis, Mary, and Michael Trout, See Me as a Person: Creating Therapeutic Relationships with Patients and Their Families (2012)
 Glembocki, Margaret J. and Joyce J. Fitzpatrick; Editors, Advancing Professional Nursing Practice: Relationship-Based Care and the ANA Standards (2013)
 Wessel, Susan and Marie Manthey, Primary nursing : person-centered care delivery system design (2015) 
 Koloroutis, Mary, RN and  David Abelson, MD, Advancing Relationship-Based Cultures (2017)
 Guanci Gen and Marky Medeiros, Shared Governance That Works (2018)

Notes

References

Links
 'Model of Care.' UC Irvine Health Sciences http://www.healthsciences.uci.edu/nursing/model-of-care.asp
 'Relationship Based Care: A Model for Transforming Practice.' Nursing Administration Quarterly http://journals.lww.com/naqjournal/Citation/2006/04000/Relationship_Based_Care__A_Model_for_Transforming.18.aspx
 Campbell, Michelle P (2004).'Relationship Based Care Is Here.' Women and Babies Hospital http://www.jlgh.org/JLGH/media/Journal-LGH-Media-Library/Past%20Issues/Volume%204%20-%20Issue%203/campbellfall09.pdf
 Shellner, Pamela (2004).'Relationship Based Care: A Model for Transforming Practice.' Journal: Critical Care Nurse http://ccn.aacnjournals.org/content/27/1/66.full
 2016 Nursing Alumni Society Board, University of Minnesota School of Nursing https://www.nursing.umn.edu/news-events/minnesota-nursing-magazine/2016-nursing-alumni-society-board
 The Interdisciplinary Journal of Partnership Studies Launch, University of Minnesota Women's Center Blog 12/5/14, https://mnwomenscenter.wordpress.com/2014/12/05/the-interdisciplinary-journal-of-partnership-studies-launch/
 Publication Ethics, https://publicationethics.org/members/creative-nursing
 Shebini, N. et al. (2008). 'Improved patient awareness of named nursing through audit.' NursingTimes.net, https://www.nursingtimes.net/roles/mental-health-nurses/improved-patient-awareness-of-named-nursing-through-audit/1425602.article
 Elizabeth Jamieson, Janice M. McCall, Lesley A. Whyte (2007). 'Clinical Nursing Practices E-Book: Guidelines for Evidence-Based Practice.'

External links 
  Creative Health Care Management website
 Creative Health Care Management Inc - Bloomberg
 WorldCat
 Interdisciplinary Journal of Partnership Studies
 CHCM Channel - Youtube
 See Me As A Person and The Healing Way - Insights by Mary Koloroutis and Michael Trout - Youtube

American companies established in 1978
Health care companies based in Minnesota